Jacky Connolly (born 1990) is an American filmmaker and video artist.

Artistic practice 
Connolly is known for her machinima filmmaking technique. She often uses The Sims, a life simulation game that she first played in the early 2000s, to create her films. 

In 2022, Connolly participated in the 2022 Whitney Biennial curated by Adrienne Edwards and David Breslin.

Filmography 

 Hudson Valley Ruins, 2016
 Ariadne, 2019

Exhibitions and screenings 

 Ariadne, Downs & Ross, Downs & Ross - Jun – Aug 2019
 Hudson Valley Ruins, Atlanta Contemporary - Dec 2016 –  Jan 2017
 Hudson Valley Ruins, The Whitney Museum of American Art - Jan 2017

Education 
Connolly earned a BFA in Photography, Art History, and Critical Studies from Bard College at Simon's Rock in 2011. In 2016, she earned an MFA in Digital Arts and MSc in Library and Information Science from Pratt Institute.

References

External links 
 Artist Profile: Jacky Connolly by Emma Hazen - Rhizome - 2016
 Jacky Connolly's Computer-Generated Doom by Josie Thaddeus-Johns - Art in America - 2022

American video artists
American contemporary artists
American women video artists
Living people
21st-century American artists
21st-century American women artists
1990 births